The State of Texas Assessments of Academic Readiness, commonly referred to as its acronym STAAR, is a series of standardized tests used in Texas public primary and secondary schools to assess a student's achievements and knowledge learned in the grade level. It tests curriculum taught from the Texas Essential Knowledge and Skills, which in turn is taught by public schools. The test used to be developed by Pearson Education every school year, although the most recent contract gave Educational Testing Service a role in creating some of the tests, under the close supervision of the Texas Education Agency.

The test was announced because the Texas Assessment of Knowledge and Skills (commonly referred to its acronym TAKS) assessment was repealed by Texas Senate Bill 1031 in spring 2007. The bill called for secondary schools (for grades 9-11) to take end of course assessments every time a student was at the end of taking a course, instead of taking general "core subject" tests. STAAR replaced the TAKS in the spring of 2012, although students who entered 10th grade before the 2011–2012 school year continued to take the TAKS. This process is part of the TAKS to STAAR transition plan. In 2015 the last students had taken the TAKS test, so the first students will graduate with a completed STAAR end of course assessments. However, many policies from the TAKS are still withheld in the STAAR's policies for practical purposes.

Schools who receive funds from the state of Texas are required to enforce these tests among students who attend the schools. Any private school, charter school, and or homeschooling that does not receive monetary support from Texas is not required to take the STAAR test, and as of May 2012 can only take the TAKS test by ordering from Pearson Education (not to be confused with Pearson PLC)

On March 16, 2020, Governor Greg Abbott waived the STAAR for the 2019–2020 school year because of the COVID-19 pandemic.

History 
When Senate Bill 1031 was passed in spring 2007, it called for the TAKS to be repealed. In 2010, Texas Commissioner of Education Robert Scott, announced the successor to the TAKS, STAAR. The STAAR had intensified rigorousness and end of course assessments, instead of a unified 9th, 10th, and 11th grade Mathematics, ELA, Science and Social Studies test. Therefore, one would take an Algebra I test in order to pass Algebra I, and so on. During a speech at the Texas Association of School Administrators’ Midwinter Conference in Austin, Scott also said the last TAKS-based school accountability ratings will be issued in 2011. Ratings will be suspended in 2012 while a new accountability system is developed. The new state rating system will debut in 2013.

On March 16, 2020, Governor Greg Abbott suspended the STAAR for the 2019–20 school year due to school closures from the 2020 coronavirus pandemic in Texas.

On April 6, 2021, the Grade 4 Writing, Grade 7 Writing, and English I STAAR tests were postponed due to technical difficulties.

Structure 

The test formats are relatively the same compared to the TAKS test in 3-8 grade, however in 9-11th grade end of course tests will be taken to supplement the normal tests taken while the TAKS was still in effect.

The STAAR end of course assessments are, in their respective order:
 English I, II
Algebra I
 Biology
 U.S. History

If a student in grade 8 or below takes Algebra I, Geometry, or Algebra II before grade 9, the student must take the respective end of course STAAR assessment as well as the standard STAAR tests given, but it is up to the school districts to determine if the student should take the STAAR Mathematics test or not; it is completely optional in this case. PSAT scores can also be used as substitute assessments.

Testing procedure 
A student will begin the test after instructions scripted by the Texas Education Agency are read aloud by the proctor/Test Administrator. The students have 4 hours to complete the test, except for the End-of-Course English tests which allow 5 hours. A lunch break or breaks for medical needs may be provided during the test administration, but during this time the students must be monitored to ensure they refrain from talking. Students may take breaks of their own volition, such as to go to the restroom but no additional time is allowed for such breaks.

When the student finishes, the student must remain in his/her seat(s) quietly. The proctor cannot help a student with the test but is allowed to help the student understand the instructions. The proctor is not allowed to access STAAR test content at any time except as mandated by a manual or documented needs of the student. Texas law provides for civil or criminal prosecution of someone divulging test content or student information. Most commonly irregularities are investigated by the school district, reported to the Texas Education Agency, and possibly referred to the Board of Educator Certification which may inscribe, suspend or revoke teaching credentials.

Any electronic devices in a student's possession must be turned off before testing begins. If a student uses a cell phone or other device to cheat or take pictures of test material during the test that student's test scores will be invalidated, and the proctor/Test Administrator of the student may have to explain how the irregularity occurred in a report to the Texas Education Agency. The proctor or student may face legal trouble as state law requires that the contents of the test are the property of the state and each student's personal information and test performance are protected for use only by those involved in the students' education.

Versions 
The STAAR test has no version for students with modified instruction or receiving instruction through bi-lingual or English-as-a-Second-Language programs. However, students may be provided with accommodations, called designated supports if they are routinely used and meet eligibility guidelines created by the Texas Education Agency. The test is available in paper form or online. The online STAAR has embedded supports available that may not be fully replicated for students testing on paper. There is also an alternative test, the STAAR-Alt2, designed for students with profound cognitive limitations.

Test development 
The Texas Education Agency, Pearson Education (Texas' state assessment contractor), and Texas public school educators collaborate to create a STAAR assessment. First, educators from all over Texas review the Texas Essential Knowledge and Skills (the statewide curriculum) to determine the objectives to assess on each grade level. However, there are usually guidelines to which questions should be tested. Student expectations that will be tested yearly are referred to as readiness standards and expectations that may or not be tested each year are referred to as supporting standards. There are rules that govern how many readiness and how many supporting standards will be used on the exam. Then educators determined how the objectives could be best assessed and developed guidelines outlining eligible test content and test-item formats. This information is transferred to the TEA and given to Pearson Education, who develops test items based on the objectives and guidelines, and the TEA reviews those items. Teacher committees are brought to Austin to review the proposed test items, and finally the items are field-tested on some Texas students, called a "mock test." Using the input of the teacher committee and the results of field-testing, TEA and Pearson build the real STAAR. Very hard questions are usually removed from the test. A more detailed explanation is available from the Student Assessment Division of TEA. Most of the procedure follows the TAKS' development procedure.

Differences between predecessors 
Like the TAKS test, STAAR employs standardized tests to assess students' skills in reading, writing, math, science, and social studies. The TEA states that "The STAAR tests will be more rigorous than the TAKS tests and are designed to measure a student’s college and career readiness, starting in elementary school."

The Texas Education Agency says that the STAAR program for grades 3–8 will assess the same subjects as TAKS did, but that for high school "...grade-specific assessments will be replaced with 12 end-of-course (EOC) assessments: Algebra I, geometry, Algebra II, biology, chemistry, physics, English I, English II, English III, world geography, world history, and U.S. history."

Like the TAKS, the STAAR is mandatory every year, unlike the Texas Assessment of Academic Skills, which called for one-time testing for every student. The STAAR also has a new time limit, four hours (except for the English I/II EOc, which have 5 hrs), unlike its predecessors, TAKS and TAAS. A dictionary policy allows students to use dictionaries in the Reading or English tests, beginning in grade 6.

Scoring 
Unlike the previous TAKS test, the commissioner of education announced on April 24, 2012 that the new performance standards students that take end of course exams must meet are Advanced Academic Performance (Highly prepared, like the TAKS test's commended level), Satisfactory Academic Performance (Sufficiently prepared but not the best, like the TAKS test's passing level), and Unsatisfactory Academic Performance (Insufficiently prepared for the next grade and does not move on to the next grade). However, Scott announced that the scoring system has been suspended for the 2011–2012 school year. There have been no announcements of grades 3-8 grading yet.

See also 

Texas Assessment of Basic Skills- the first standardized test used by Texas from 1980 until 1983.
Texas Educational Assessment of Minimum Skills - the second standardized test used by Texas from 1984 until 1990.
Texas Assessment of Academic Skills - the third standardized test used by Texas from 1991 until 2002.
Texas Assessment of Knowledge and Skills - the fourth standardized test used by Texas from 2003 until 2011.
 Texas Essential Knowledge and Skills - commonly referred to as TEKS, the state mandated curriculum of Texas.

References

External links 
STAAR Resources from the Texas Education Agency
Texas Essential Knowledge and Skills
Top 10 Free Websites for STAAR Math Preparation

Public education in Texas